John Gordon Davidson (b. August 5, 1918 - d. August 8, 2004) was a Canadian professional ice hockey player. Davidson played 51 games in the National Hockey League for the New York Rangers. He was born in Stratton, Ontario, but grew up in Moose Jaw, Saskatchewan.

References

External links

1918 births
2004 deaths
Canadian expatriate ice hockey players in the United States
Canadian ice hockey defencemen
Ice hockey people from Saskatchewan
New York Rangers players
New York Rovers players
People from Moose Jaw